Adalbert Marksteiner was a football player who had represented both Hungary and Romania and a coach.

Honours

Club
Ripensia Timişoara
Liga I (1): 1937–38
Csepel SC
Nemzeti Bajnokság I (3): 1941–42, 1942–43, 1947–48

Individual
 Liga I top scorer (1): 1938–39
 Hungarian Football Federation Player of the Year (1): 1948

References

External links 

1919 births
1976 deaths
Romanian footballers
Hungarian footballers
Romania international footballers
Hungary international footballers
Dual internationalists (football)
Liga I players
FC Ripensia Timișoara players
Csepel SC footballers
Romanian football managers
Hungarian football managers
Debreceni VSC managers
Budapesti VSC managers
Association football forwards
Sportspeople from Timișoara